() , is a Japanese fashion subculture. The term gyaru is a Japanese transliteration of the English slang word .

When the women's jeans line 'GALS' was released in the 1970s; the term had been quickly used outside of its original branding and was adopted to describe the  fashion by 1972.  subculture was at its peak during the Heisei era. It had a large influence on Japanese fashion and its economy, its international economy, and its global soft power across the world through Cool Japan such as in Southeast Asia and internationally. Multiple  brands branched out before eventually declining due to financial instability and changes in its target demographic. The terms usage peaked in the early 2000s and has gradually declined since.

This decline has been attributed to shifts in magazine industry, the exaggeration of the style in terms of its style use and progression, western media, and government policies. The meaning of the term  gradually drifted to apply to a slightly older demographic whose apparent lack of interest in work or marriage resulted in these women being regarded as childish or as a hussy. Yet, it can be stated that this very same sentiment is argued against by other Japanese citizens.

The department store Shibuya 109, across the intersection from the Shibuya station in Tokyo, was a popular location for purchasing  style clothing and was where this fashion subculture was most often seen. Although 109 began as the primary source of  style clothing, the style's growth in popularity saw brands branching out, having different brands of clothing being available at pop up stores, in conventions or through web shops that offered international shipping. Second hand and vending of  apparel and accessories also increased their availability.

Description

Some groups and people follow a type of Japanese street fashion with many subcategories and substyles of which many types originated in the late 1970s. It is a fashion subculture that is considered to be nonconformist or rebelling against the Japanese standards of its society and beauty at the time when women were expected to be housewives and fit the Asian beauty standards of pale skin and dark hair. For Japanese women who saw those who participated in this fashion during its rise, they considered it a fashion style too racy and freewheeling; with some feeling it caused a ruckus, juvenile delinquency and frivolousness among teenage women. Its popularity peaked in the 1990s and early 2000s. They are also known for partying or clubbing, being rather provocative, being flirtatious, and unwinding and having fun.

In Japan they are also both known for being models for Gravure from the books they have appeared in.

Appearance

By the early 2010s  fashion was typically characterized by tanned skin as it is considered a must in some substyles, they were also most often seen with highly elongated and decorated artificial nails. The makeup typically consists of black eye liner, fake eyelashes, and sometimes a white eye shadow or a touch of that color is applied to either the inner eye corners or to the outer corners near the lower lash line of the eyes. This is to make them appear larger or to contour them to elongate the eye of the sclera. This should not be confused with periorbital puffiness, even though both look similar; one is a health condition while the other is done with makeup or by the use of plastic surgery such as botox. Also contouring different parts of the face to change facial features and highlighting the nose for a slimming effect is often done. Colored contacts are often seen especially circle lenses to change eye color from a distance and also to make their eyes appear larger with the extreme diameter of these lenses.

Hairstyling can differ from substyle within  fashion subculture such as the hair texture, color or styling could differ from what one would participate in. Heavily bleached or dyed hair is most often seen; shades would greatly differ from dark brown to lighter shades of brown or multiple different shades of blonde. Hair is mostly styled either by curling it with a curling iron or having straight hair done by the use of a hair straightener. But some hairstyling may differ depending on which styles or substyle one would participate in; hair may be curled to create extra volume and heavily crimped up. The hair is crimped differently than in the West, this hair styling was called ; in English it means assorted streaks. This styling is named so, not only because of its enormous volume of hair, the usage of hair extension to achieve this look or even its use of an assortment of wigs to create this hairstyle. But this name comes from these streaks of hair that are made apparent by being held by gel. Since after the curling and crimping; the gel would be used to keep a type of hair streaks, that they were visible and these streaks would stay throughout the day.

Apparel for  fashion differs depending on which  substyle the individual has chosen to include themselves in and from where they would buy their items; this choice of brands can denote which substyle one is from or is participating in. Japanese street fashion brands or western fast fashion brands with general  aesthetics would determine ones style in the  fashion substyle depending on their appearance in an outfit. Some would have the luxury to buy from western luxury brands or even haute couture brands, but for most and even those who lived in Japan; they usually gravitated toward Japanese brands, depending on their style. Most of the apparel originated from Shibuya 109. A full outfit of only designer brands is not considered completely  unless one is trying for a specific substyle. Yet, even those who participate in the substyle of wearing designer items do have different brands that do not all originate from the same designer, regardless of whether the brands are Western or Japanese. They would generally mix their whole outfit of different brands to create a  look.

Common styles

 is a spectrum style. There are various subcategories of  fashion depending on the choice of apparel and gender. It consists of the most common way to name someone who is in  style. As  is not a singular style, it is an umbrella term for its many subcategories, sub styles or themes of  since it is a spectrum style. The Japanese word for   translates to the English word type; meaning its usage refers to the fact that this fashion has so many subcategories and sub styles that it is indeed akin to a type or system of styles, in terms of fashion.

  : a style that was highly active,  was mostly inspired by, and its aesthetic referenced in, the magazine . It is a very foxy, ladylike, and mature style. It is generally worn by, but not always exclusive to, a hostess. The intention is to be flawlessly glamorous and desirable. The  style has an emphasis on the eyes, often enlarging and enhancing them with circle lenses and several sets of false eyelashes in an alluring way. The hair is always styled in an updo, resembling , with curls or hair that is crimped in the  hair style, and sometimes includes extensions and wigs. It is common for those participating in the  style to wear multiple wigs at the same time. Japanese fashion brands most recognized in this substyle are DaTuRa, Jesus Diamante, La Parfait, MA*RS and Princess Melody.
  : A style that is heavily inspired by American culture; its name can be directly translated to American casual. It is usually a very bright, fun, flamboyant and generally multi colored style. Inspired by fictionalized images of America the clothes are generally looser than most of the other styles. They usually have many layers that overlap each other. It mostly involves sweaters, bomber jackets from the early 2000 and coats such as Letterman jackets. In the summer they would wear t-shirts, shorts, jeans, overalls and cargo pants. Also, they would sometimes wear their boyfriends clothing as there was a male counterpart to the brand COCO*LULU; which is one of the staple brands for this style. Shoes were mostly tennis shoes, sneakers, uggs or engineer boots. Japanese fashion brands most recognized in this substyle are ANAP, COCO*LULU and Wakatsuki Chinatsu.
 B- : A  style, consisting of not only being  but also rejecting the Japanese standards of beauty to instead become black. As the letter B in this substyle directly refers to the word black. This style is synonymous with the  store Baby Shoop.
But white is most often used eyeshadow for this substyle. Also, decorations such as glitter or flowers, such as hibiscus flower stickers added under the eyes. This style was popular in the late 1990s and early 2000s.
It specifically targets the concept of either being an actual celebrity in the  style or to achieve that aesthetic to the point of becoming someone with the celebrity status by achieving this through this substyle. For most participants of this particular substyle, they could only first dream of living this substyle but have successfully achieved this feat through dedication, persistence and effort. Since it is probably one of the most expensive substyles to maintain if one would try to replicate it. This style at first might resemble  but when looking at not only at which apparel pieces that are being used; from which these brands that are far above the average price of  brands from 109. These apparel pieces from clothes, accessories, shoes to even flip phones in order to be based on that time period are needed to achieve the celebrity appearance. Those who participated and contributed in this substyle have been others who started mostly without a celebrity status or any sort of exponential media recognition in Japan. What these  tried to achieve is to replicate the whole look of a celebrity during the Heisei era or 1990s and 2000s; these celebrities were generally chosen for their luxury clothing choices which was always of a 'McBling' aesthetic at the time. Luxury and haute couture brands are a must; fast fashion, poorly made apparel, inauthentic luxury branded apparel to accessories or second hand pieces do not suffice. Unless these items are from an actual luxury or haute couture brand that were authenticated but then only by that standard; otherwise new and on trend haute couture fashion is a must. These brands do not have to be Japanese owned or Japanese based brands; most of these brands are actually western brands such as: Juicy Couture, Baby Phat, Betsey Johnson, Von Dutch, Ed Hardy, Chanel, Moschino, Michael Kors, Versace, Fendi, Louboutin, Balenciaga, Coach, Burberry, Gucci and even Givenchy when Alexander McQueen was the head designer and the same can be said for Dior especially when John Galliano was head designer of said haute couture brand. Most of its inspirations came from either Japanese  celebrities such as Ayumi Hamasaki, Koda Kumi, Namie Amuro, egg magazine model Hiromi Endo and more recently Emiri Aizawa or Tsubasa Masuwaka aesthetically when she is going to Gucci's fashion events. Even western celebrities had a much larger influence such as: Paris Hilton, Nicole Richie, Britney Spears, Gwen Stefani, Christina Aguilera, Pamela Anderson, Lindsay Lohan, Victoria Beckham, Fergie, Jennifer Lopez, Beyoncé, Aaliyah, Lil' Kim and Foxy Brown.
  : Teenage  or women who continued with this style even after having children. BBC News states: 'Gal mama are young mothers who refuse to shed their gal-ness'. For example, Aki, a  leader of her own  named 'Brillant Lab' reveals how these mothers dressed and how they chose their children's outfits, hair and hair color to correspond to their mother's outfit. In other words, the child became a 's accessory. It is also telling when the leader of this  is a single mother which is generally how most of these  mothers end up or are after being pregnant. These mothers might have different ways of being a parent than most in Japan; their parenting style can be quite contemporary for the Japanese societal norms, perceptions and it has been said that it is less stressful for their children.
  : A male .
Rose patterns, rosettes, pearls, and crown motifs are also very common. Headpieces range from large bow clips with pearls to headbands with a rose accent, while the hair is either bleached in a specific color, crimped in a bouffant at the top and curled or wigs/extension are worn to create that  or  styled hair. This make-up style has even more exaggerated eyes than the typical .  does not only include clothes, but many girls see it as a way of life and make or buy custom made decor for their homes. Though this substyle can still be present today in some of these fashion groups or in their circles. Not to be confused with Japanese street fashion of Lolita fashion.
 : The toned down version of the  style. As stated above, it is referred as  due to being not only a toned down version of this already pre-existing style that existed at that time but the Japanese term  is a shortened version of the word casual in Japanese Katakana. There is an obvious focus on comfort, cuteness and being effortless. Even today with being confused with the fashion of Cottagecore. The hair styles often resembling ; in the sense of them having curled hair which would often be either long or short in length. The hair would be often worn down and the color would mostly be from completely bleached blonde to lighter shades of brown. Clothing wise, this style would be on the more comfortable spectrum of  but still remaining as flattering as  could be. Common motifs are roses and hearts and patterns that are the most often seen are ginghams, florals and plaid. Colors most often used would be pink and most outfits who were or are using this style would always feature something in a pink shade. The style now is most ubiquitous with the use of the fashion brand Liz Lisa; rather than any other brand which had the similar feel such as Ank Rouge, TraLaLa or Titty&Co.
 : Is a term that generally defines present  that dress in this manner; they wear Japanese high-school student uniforms as a form or way to represent the past  who wore them. These uniforms would be either similar in appearance to them but with slight alterations such as color or presentation of the garment. Or they would be an exact replica of an actual highschool uniform which could be purchased at a burusera. But the term itself did not first start as a pass time to pretend or dress as a high school student but from actual female Japanese high schoolers in the late 1980s and early 1990s, around the Heisei era; they wore this style during or after school sessions. They would shorten their skirts from their high school uniform protocol length to give them a miniskirt appearance and length and wear loose socks. These socks are from an American brand called E.G. Smith, they are the sock brand of actual origin to these socks. That made them longer and appear larger by loosening them to the point of almost arriving at the level of their shoes. They also had dyed hair, accessorized their high school bags with danglers or mixed educational material with cosmetic products and a portable mirror. Although some of these were prohibited in Japanese high schools, some would wear it mostly after school but some would still do it even in school and be warned for doing so. Namie Amuro is said to be not only the one who popularized the tanned appearance, but also as having started the  trend during the Heisei era. It uses the word  which is girl and  highschooler in English. The importance of these two words is that often seen on social network services, were these Kanji would be abbreviated to JK; due to the fact that the first letters used in these Kanji are the letters J and K. In this case, these letters combined are not used to convey or be internet speech to refer to joking but is a direct abbreviation for the word .
 :   is the over exaggeration of the  fashion that has gone over the top. It is too expensive to maintain and is too dangerous too participate as it is a working with the Black Diamond  or   that is run by a pimp. The words  are made together by the numbers just as   being 46 as these ones make   as in 96. In Japanese being  .
Accessories (such as bangles, beads, etc.) would also include the motif of flowers such as leis or hibiscus, of which these patterns would appear on their clothes. Colorful clothing was considered to be essential. They would sometimes wear sweatshirts, pants, and leg warmers. Disney characters made an appearance as a choice of fashion apparel such as characters from Lilo & Stitch and also characters from the Mickey Mouse franchise. The white lips remained and white eye shadows were applied. A  eye shadow can also be placed on a different place around the eyes. The amount of eye shadow could vary greatly. Some  also used a different eye shadow color on their eyelids. The use of glitter was acceptable as well. Stickers were not used under the eyes anymore, instead, they were replaced with rhinestones (however they did not necessarily put them on). Common hairstyles featured big hair, bouffant, high ponytails with hair partly down, synthetic dreads, ribbons braided in, teased, side swept, fringe, braids, curled, simply straight, or very colorful. Popular hair accessories included leis and other types of flowers/bows, straw cowboy hats, or straw hats. Flip flops, sandals, platform sandals, slippers, crocs, boots or leg warmers could also be worn.

The  magazine of choice is Soul Sister. This style can be understood by its style choice of apparel, such as track suits, a larger use of denim and a generally more masculine look. These girls were often seen driving as a couple, were or are mechanics and sometimes ride bikes. They tend to have tattoos and piercings. This not only done to look rebellious but the style caters to girls who live on the edge.
The aesthetic is commonly mistaken for Cottagecore due to its use of colors, patterns and motifs. It has many similarities today in the style  but instead is considered a style of its own. The colors are more subtle and muted, patterns range from floral to gingham and sometimes polka dots. It is also one of the more 'casual'  substyles of this fashion. The style consisted of having  hair color ranging from darker browns to strawberry blonde tones. The hair was often curled, wispy or had fly away hairs but retained the constrained  hairstyles or was simply worn down but slightly curled at the ends. The makeup is considered too simple for the most experienced ; in terms of style and it is less use of overtly longer nails or false lashes. As mentioned earlier, the nails are just a plain color that matches the clothing worn or are French manicured. Motifs would include fruits; mostly strawberries, cherries or when going towards a different primary color such as blue; blueberries. Textile prints are mostly ginghams, polka dots, florals and sometimes plaids. Other fabrics found are lace on some apparel pieces but not as prevalent as the  style. In terms of accessories boots with heels and are mostly knee-high length, are most often seen and worn in this style.
Only thinking that  is depicted by the  substyle and its subcategories with the thought that only the most participants having tanned skin is  even if it is not necessary for all of its substyles.  is an example of this: one who would participate  would not tan their skin and would most likely try to achieve a clear complexion to return to the Japanese tradition and standard look of bihaku. This  substyle is generally a way to denote participants of the  substyle who do not sport a tan. They still usually wear a number of different substyles. But this substyle was most often seen in the early 2010s. Mostly sweeter styles and punkish styles of appareal and  fashion substyles would be seen having this type of skintone. The multiple problems that arose from the issue of skintone, is with that previous participants of  substyles such as  who already have or had artificially tanned skin, with the use of tanning lotions or through excessive amounts of sun light; will resort to bleaching their skin to achieve this look. This can be also said the same to those that wanted to achieve the appearance of pearly white skin texture but being already pale by nature, yet they would still use these dangerous products. In both cases, tanning and bleaching the skin is dangerous.
The term of  comes from the word strength in Japanese,  and one of the reason that this style is based on this term is the masculine empowering look and less feminine appeal towards men this style has.
 ,: An exaggerated style characterized by an extremely dark artificial tan, messy bleached-white hair, and white makeup.  is said to be inspired by the Japanese yōkai Yama-uba , an unkempt old woman with dark skin, white hair, and a dirty, unkempt appearance, who would disguise herself as a beautiful young woman to lure male victims. Like , the style was often considered to be a joke and deliberately unattractive, with some  saying they liked the trend "because it looked stupid."  fashion attracted a reputation as being "unclean" or delinquent.

Micro styles of  

This style is often confused with due to their similarities but are vastly different and are two separate styles.
's also often wear darker colors than s and dress in club wear or feminine outfits. They are toned down in term of its predecessors ,  and  but are still connected to those styles.
 : this look usually includes much gold and jewelry. It is similar to B-gyaru. As stated above, egg magazine did not consider this a serious style or even a style at all, but more of a joke. This might be the case since the name of this substyle might refer to the Italian word 'bimbo' which is derogatorily applied to females in English.
  (Bohemian ): A  substyle which is rarely worn and is considered less of an actual style and more of a seasonal outfit for those who participate in broader  fashion. Mostly due to it being less of a substyle restrained by rules and it being mostly worn in the spring and summer seasons or for those that live in warmer climates. Since the clothing pieces are of a lighter textile, only a jacket is used for layering, more often are woven leather accessories such as a belt and shoes are seen then in other substyles. Instead most of the other substyles that use more apparel that would hold warmth easily, such as apparel with thicker textile or wollen materials and the use of multiple different layers of clothes for one outfit. This style is also denoted by its use of very airy, denim, flower patterned, tie-dyed and nomadic textile motifs in most of its outfits within it. Most apparel piece are mostly dresses that are either maxi dresses or only being at knee length. The style seems to be heavily inspired to even emulate the late 1960s Hippie fashion and takes its name from the Bohemian style of fashion.
 : Just as the styles of B-, bibinba and even  are or can be somewhat frowned upon by most people who have the actual respective origin of these styles or those who suffered through what these style can represent to the actual person of that ethnicity; such as  being so heavily influenced by the appearance of Rastafari; the question always remains, is it appropriation or appreciation of another countries culture? For  the same can be said for its substyle, as this comes from the Chicano culture that even in its own history has connotations of its own; the book Comentarios Reales de los Incas has a quote that describes, evokes, shows how the actual word came to be and how it was utilized then in 1609: 'The child of a Black male and an Indian female, or of an Indian male and Black female, they call mullato and mullata. The children of these they call cholos. Cholo is a word from the Windward Islands. It means dog, not of the purebred variety, but of very disreputable origin; and the Spaniards use it for insult and vituperation.' The style itself takes enormous influence from Chicano as many  wear apparel clothes that are more often than not the same as Chicano apparel or street wear. A combination of tartans, flannels, oversized t-shirts and tank tops. Accessorized with bandanas, a baseball cap, dark sunglasses, gold chains and even tattoos; which still in present-day Japan is still considered a taboo due to its past connotations. Also baggy jeans are a must. There is also a Japanese music artist that both exemplifies both  but most of all Chicana cultural in terms of style that she is influenced by; being MoNa. She has also been interviewed and documented in the series from Refinery29: Style out there and also by The New York Times YouTube channel.
 : a style of  consisting of reviving  through technology. It takes aspects of the  fashion substyle and then makes use of technology as a way to revamp the style. The creators of this style have created all of their items themselves, which can be LED lights or synthesizers which are used on accessories such as necklaces, loose socks which are those mostly seen on kogyarus. They would create new and different apparel pieces from the regular  clothing pieces since they are mixed with technological enhancements. The creators of this fashion substyle are both, Kyoko from Japan and Mao from Thailand, who immigrated to Japan, and has a degree in engineering.
This substyle does not require the participant to tan themselves unlike most of the other  substyles. The makeup does remain the same over exaggerated and dramatic false eyelash appearance but the makeup colors are more in line with Gothic fashion as the colors are darker or even black and white are more predominant then in the other substyles, The fashion motifs and pieces are generally studded, leather, ripped denim, mesh or fishnet apparel pieces with the most prominent apparel colors being black, white, red, purple and any color used in the actual Gothic fashion. But these color choices would generally remain with traditional gothic fashion.
 : To understand the substyle , one must first understand its origin in its name. This substyle is the epitome of this; simply by its name alone this can be already understood; the difference of spelling is simply for youth factor, by accentuating the vowels and adding the letter 'Y' to also not be too obvious about it. Examples of this  fashion substyle resemble the work of artist Lisa Frank due to their use of motifs and color, with bright neon colors from across the entire spectrum. Leopard, cheetah, zebra or anything in printed patterns to early 1990s to 2000s Hip hop inspired fashion such has 'McBling'. Clothing shape vary from very loose fitting to tight but the colors are never toned down. In terms of makeup, this  substyle and the substyles that range from ganguro to further are the only ones with the use of more pop in terms of color while most  substyles use either muted to seemingly girly colors, most of these would be pastel colors, such as pastel pink. The creator of this  substyle has been credited to the egg model Kaoru Watanabe as she not only created this substyle but also her own brand to supply for this fashion JSG, the acronym for Japanese Super Girl.
Instead of someone making their skin twice as dark than their actual skin color, it's the use of face paint to seem as if the participant had physically dipped themselves in a colorful paint, to resemble something of an extraterrestrial, but with the same essential style of  makeup. This micro style can be seemingly placed as a form of body art. The translation of this substyle is unique skin  in English. The creator of this style,  Akane states in an Arte interview: 'I decided to create this style since that this style was created due to the fact that westerns have different hair and skin colors compared to the stereotypical Japanese features of pale clear skin and black hair, so when we want to do this we have to do something drastic. So, by changing our skin color or painting it we get to liberate ourselves; it is like a therapy from makeup, we are allowed to choose our hair color and skin color'. She also states that 'There are many mixed marriage children that are subject to a number of prejudices because of their skin color or their hair color; that is why I want to help by saying loud and strong that everyone is allowed to be whom they want to be.' In a Kotaku interview she stated that she has 'longed for the interesting skin tones seen in video-games, anime, and movies'. This fashion substyle in  has been promoted in egg magazine with positive regard.
These  wear the kigurumi outfits as apparel or the mascot apparel of Japan but still apply and wear the same makeup and have tanned skin as the participants of manba.
 :  is the use of  that tries to look seductive with less expansive materials.
 :  is separate from B- and bibinba but it is still considered under the same style umbrella or spectrum in terms of style; due to its heavy influence of African culture as a style resource. Especially  would most often take influence of Rastafari culture; even though it would be mostly used to resemble the appearance of a Rastafari which would effectively seem more as cultural appropriation then actual culture appreciation.  is most often characterized by its use of Jamaican flag as an accessory, leisure wear to sport clothing sporting a Cannabis plant symbol or Rastafari colors, handbags made of straw or anything that would resemble with the idea of what Rastafari would wear. Colors would be predominantly green, yellow and red just as the Jamaican Rastafari flag. The hair once again very similar to B-s; meaning going from extensions to cornrows, micro-braids except dreadlocks, an afro and dreads would rarely appear in the B-s hair choices. Even though both styles have to try to replicate these hairstyle but effectively cannot. Also B-'s do not appear often wearing a Cannabis symbol in their accessories. A somewhat obsession with Bob Marley, as to say that to the participants of this style would immediately recognize this singer but they do listen to other Reggae music too.
 :  is the punk version of  but without the counter culture and against fascism as punk it is a materialistic fashion that is about consume clothing and money to boost the Japanese economy but with prostitution.
But instead  keeps the  makeup, the deep tan, style and aesthetic to a great affect. It does not tone it down just adds a romantic aspects to their apparel. Tanning achieved mainly through make-up and deep colored tanning lotions, bronzer; sunbeds are not a thing in this substyle as they try to keep their complexion deepen but not darker than intended. But they do instead appreciate more tone down things in life than just clubbing.
 :  or psychedelic ; it is a fashion substyle of  that is meant to emulate Bohemian style fashion and 60's hippie fashion but with no impliminetation of the peace movement of the hippies during the 1960s in United States of America during the Vietnam war.

Styles with  origin and influence 

They dress in a particular style that makes them mostly wear dresses that are revealing but said to be not as much, from the Japanese brand MA*RS or from the Jesus Diamante. She should be noted as she is a hostess who has amassed a total sum of 200 million yen or approximately 1,8 million dollars annually as a hostess. Due to certain health circumstances she cannot drink alcohol. But in return for her astounding efforts she had been gifted by her hostess club a champagne tower of 100 million yen or 910 thousand dollars. Before her retirement, she had written a semi-autobiographical novel about her teenage life and her path to becoming the leading  titled  or Miss Kyaba: Boss of Kabukicho No.1 miss Emiri Aizawa's way of life.
 : Mago gyaru is used to define middle schoolers who follow gyaru or kogyaru fashion. The phrase literally translates to grandchild gyaru.
 : This is the name that was coined for  that wanted to revitalize the style during the 2010s during its decline. By the time the style reached popularity and people had noticed its existence, the community of  reacted to it differently than expected; what came was an antiquated, radical and older or more fanatical  accustomed to seeing  in a different ideal and some have even shunned the style. This reaction can also be connected with the creator of the style and magazine for this substyle  being the known as '#N'. This substyle and magazine has gotten backlash due to appropriation of black, Latino and Hindu culture and culturally exclusive accessories such as the Bindi. Yet Alisa Ueno herself, has stated in an interview, on her own blog that herself, her own brand FIG&VIPER and the style she is representing within that brand has nothing to do with the  subculture or fashion as a whole and the style was a probable misconception from magazines and Japanese television programs implying that it was. Even though she participated in the  subculture when she was young, as a model; she has stated in her own blog, 'The fashion has nothing to do with her brand.' But those who were wearing said fashion were not using the same fashion style as before or in its traditional form as a substyle; from its apparel to their makeup. To previous, older and newcomers to the  fashion substyle perceived it as not following the traditional  look or values of the  subculture. To them it looked more western or even resembling grunge wear. Even though the style may resemble SeaPunk more than the actual grunge fashion it is said to resemble.
 : This substyle was coined during the decline of  subculture and new  looks during the 2010s. The naming of this substyle derives from the Japanese word  which in English can be translated as 'neat', 'polished' and 'clean'.

Western  or  
Women and even men who have found  fashion outside Japan and have decided to participate in said fashion subculture; western  includes countries also outside of the West, such as the Middle East. With the women who have gravitated towards this fashion by going or doing  and its multiple substyles. Western  or  created their own communities or groups and forums which they communicate amongst one another.

That is not to say that during its popularity online in the past and even now that there is only positivity within its community.

Outside of Japan, most western participants have been subjected to websites dedicated to criticism of  participants. Some of these website are currently active. These websites ridicule people's looks or appearance by giving them advice on how to better wear the style. A documentary has been made on YouTube, about three different Japanese street fashion styles and the journeys of these three participatants and how they navigated their way with these styles and the negative influences each of members of differing styles can come across online in their own style of choice. Even so, in 2011, these western or  held their first event the ' Awards' which was created by an English  with the online username Lhouraii Li. It was done to spread awareness of this style and to bring positivity back into the western  community. These events lasted until 2014 with Lhouraii Li and these events were mostly done online. They were stopped in 2014 by the creator of the event, Lhouraii Li, due to online backlash against her online award show. Since 2014 there would not be another contest until 2016 where they were made into an event in the Netherlands and was broadcast through a livestream. Three years would past until this community award ceremony would be brought back in 2019 in the United Kingdom, just as in 2016 this was an in-person event and was only made into a live broadcast online for those not able to join the event. These contests were made so that one could vote for contestants within categories or subcategories of this fashion and gain Internet attention from peers by winning within a category.

International and national meetings among members of the  community were held on an almost annual basis.

This has affected the  community as well, as a new  magazine had gotten published named Papillon in October 2019. The foreign magazine  also made a comeback.

In 2021, the  magazine 'GAL VIP' had gotten an article written about their magazines from Japanese website; it is the oldest  magazines addressed and not the latest.

Gaijin gyaru magazines 
As stated before, the  magazine Papillon was published in 2019, but there were two predecessors of magazines for  before being Gyaru-go who only published on April 12, 2016, and Gal-VIP on September 1, 2012. They are both online magazines while Papillon has online and purchasable issues.
 Gal VIP
 Gyaru-go
 Papillon

Related media

Clothing brands

 Alba Rosa
 ANAP
 Ank Rouge
 Ash & Diamonds
 Baby Doll
 Baby Shoop
 Barak
 Black Queen
 Blue Moon Blue
 Cecil McBee
 COCO*LULU
 DaTuRa
 Delyle Noir
 D.I.A.
 Diavlo
 DURAS
 Egoist
 Emoda
 EmiriaWiz
 ENVYM
 FIG&VIPER
 Galaxxxy
 GALEO
 GALSTAR
 GALSVILLE
 Garula
 Ghost of Harlem
 GILFY
 Glad News
 Glavil TutuHA
 GOLDS Infinity
 GYDA
 Ingni
 Jesus Diamante
 JSG
 Jury Black
 Kiss Kiss
 La Carte
 Laguna Moon
 La Pafait
 LB-03
 LDS
 Lip Service
 Love Boat
 MADSTAR
 MAJORENA
 MA*RS
 MarpleQ
 Me Jane
 Miauler Mew
 Michell Macaron
 Moussy
 MURAUA
 One spo
 Parfereine
 Penderie
 Pinky Girls
 Pink Latte 
 Princess Melody
 Rady
 RESEXXY
 Rienda
 Rodeo Crowns
 Rose fan fan
 Roxy
 Ruby rose
 SBY
 Shake Shake
 SLANGY
 SLY
 Sneep Dip
 Snidel
 SpiralGirl
 Sex Pot ReVeNGe
 Titty&Co
 THIRTEEN XIII
 TraLaLa
 ValenTine's High
 Vanquish
 Vence
 Wakatsuki Chinatsu

Magazines 

 AneAgeha
 Betty
 Blenda
 Blenda Black
 Cawaii!
 Decolog Paper
 DoCoMo Girls Style
 Edge Style
 egg
 egg's beauty
 Ego system
 ES POSHH!
 GLiA
 Happie Nuts
 Hair Make Nuts
 Hime!
 I LOVE MAMA
 JELLY
 Katy
 KiLaLa
 Koakuma Ageha
 LOVEggg
 Mama Jelly
 MensEGG
 Men's Knuckle
 Nicky
 PopSister
 Popteen
 Ranzuki
 Ranzuki Shibu*suna!
 Rose
 Serve!! Ranzuki
 Scramble egg
 Shibuya 109 Book
 Soul Sister
 Vanilla GiRL

scandals in Japan 
In 2012 the  model Jun Komori committed fraud and helped with said fraud on an online auction website in Japan. She worked with Ryusuge Suzuki, who was the penny orders section owner of the 'World Auction' website in Japan. She had to close her official web blog due to the backlash of her actions.

Yet knowing her travel visa for Japan had expired, she had thought that marrying someone she knew and paying 1 million yen for it, that she could stay longer. She has worked as massues, a kyabakura and a fuzoku or a prostitute. But this is considered a breach of promise in marrige as she and her then partner were both in aggrement to get married for money and residency. At the same time that this news came out to the public eye varying news outlets that interviewed her were all lied to by telling her part of the side of her arrest but skewing the style of apperal or her reason for doing so; this is called a providing a false statement to the law instead of following the legal information retrieval law. Her reasoning for doing such a thing had also left a sour taste to other Japanese fashion and enthusiats of Japanese styles such as lolita fashion and cosplayers. She was since been deported from Japan for these actions.

On February 3, 2015, in Shinjuku 'Lumine EST' mall three  Rady shop staff were arrested and charged with both stealing apparel which amounted to 1,100,000 yen or 10,000 dollars when adjusting for inflation from various stores and selling it. This was calculated to be the equivalent of 5,000,000 yen which is 46,000 dollars; a grand total of 6,100,000 yen or 56,000 dollars of both theft and money laundering when calculated with inflation. It is stated that the crime occurred due to shop staff only getting paid about 880 yen an hour; the equivalent of 8 dollars. The  brand Rady, closed its store within the same month in that very same mall in Shinjuku.

In 2021, egg magazine created a video on their official YouTube channel by making a prank video and using domestic violence as the joke. They used makeup to create fake wounds or damage that can be created from the domestic violence and by the end of the video laughing at the prank video they made. All of the participants, models and the egg magazine model herself participated in the creation of the video, the decision to make it or complied in the creation of the video. The video shows the participants and models not taking domestic violence at serious face value. The date of the video's release was on International Women's Day as well as Women's History Month, which attracted even more criticism. Even though the video was supposed to be considered a prank; some of their Japanese and Western fans have shown their disdain for this video in the comment section. Foreign  or  community have come out and demanded other participants of this fashion subculture to report the video from YouTube. They also expressed shame that their favorite magazine, egg, had created this video without any forethought towards the actual subject matter or victims of domestic violence.

: is not a style, rather it is a title that  have garnered themselves over the years because of their manner of showing and acting out towards others on the street, these  have carried as the over prevailing years of its existence of as a subculture of Japanese street fashion. Especially when this title has been given by the Japanese population when asked in a survey of the most used words of the decades or buzzword rather which are used on a daily basis. Because of their rudeness towards others, masculine character: such as drinking beer, smoking in public places, swearing, and overtly sexual manner of dress.   and is used as slang to describe the most revolting .

Charity and Fundraising Events 
Following the 2011 Tōhoku earthquake and tsunami,  clothing brand GALSTAR launched a fundraising event where they donated a percentage of their revenue to the Japanese Red Cross Society.

Activities

Dancing 
It is mostly danced with Eurobeat music or covers of other song but with the aforementioned Eurobeat remix. Such a remix is for example songs from Japanese singer ICHIDAI being a famously remixed into eurobeat and danced to.

The one of the most famous parapara song and its tagline being 'GET WILD & BE SEXY' is synonymous with  culture which was of a famous eurobeat song of the same name, by the group called Eurocker-Girlz also abbreviated to E-Girlz. There is a diverse choice number of songs that can be danced to parapara.

There are people performing parapara on YouTube in the past and even today; but the most dedicated channel to perform parapara on YouTube is the YouTube channel  or 'Para Para Yurakucho@Hong Kong', they are still active to this day. Another active platform with eurobeat has its own website that is being regularly updated by enthusiasts of Eurobeat on the website eurobeat-prime.

Hobbies 

These photo booths are often used by groups, couples, or individuals to capture ridiculous poses depending on the preferences of the participants. Purikura booths are mostly located in the electronic district of Tokyo, Akihabara, where they are a popular activity for both casual  enthusiasts and professional  models. In addition to being a hobby, purikura booths can be used as a way into magazines.

Originating from Japan,  involves the decoration of mobile phones and other electronic devices with materials such as acrylic, rhinestones, Swarovski crystals, silicone and polymer clay.  decoration is often ostentatious and makes use of 3D motifs as well as media influences.  has also been used for events. Acer Inc. held a  contest for the release of their Acer Aspire One netbook laptops in 2009. The contest involved three contestants presenting their different  designs for the netbooks in addition to a popularity poll.

Events and meetings 

The Japanese word  is a direct reference to the English word events. These events typically consist of clubbing, karaoké, purikura, going out to eat at fast food chains or restaurants, and showing their outfits off to one another.

One of the most famous  groups is Angeleek, which consisted of at least twelve members who predominantly wore . They have been promoted numerous times in egg magazine and on national Japanese television. Another prominent  in the same district of Tokyo is Shibuya's НЯК, also known by their Japanese  name, . It boasted Shibuya's largest , with over a thousand members. As of 2021, Nachu, the leader of this , still has a website. НЯК has also made their own music.  have seen a recent revival as of the 2010s with the creation of the newer group, Black Diamond.

Cafés 
 have their own themed cafés. Similar to maid cafés, waitresses wear  attire and exhibit exaggerated personas in addition to other  themed rituals. For instance, a general rule in  cafés is the prohibition of polite honorific speech . Other  cafés, such as galcafé 10sion, offer services such as the chance to wear  makeup or receive a full  makeover. Another notable café targeted towards the  subculture is Beauty Café by GirlsAward. Created by the prominent fashion event GirlsAward, this café employs  reader models  as an additional draw.

Influence in media

Music
[[File:Kumi Koda Con 2005.jpg|thumb|{{Transliteration|en|Hepburn|Koda Kumi}} performing at a convention in 2005]]

Other J-pop artists that were considered to be essential to listen to were LOVE to LOVE, GAL DOLL,  and Juliet. But these are far from the only musicians  listen to there are many such as singer know by her stage name Sifow also known as  who at the time, was not only a model but also a singer for J-Pop as she had been a solo artist when starting her music career as Sifow. She has already announced her retirement from the music industry back in 2008 and has now her own established a cooperation for the advocacy of health; which not only relates to food but also agriculture and dieting as a business, it is called: Office G-Revo Corporation.

Prominent Japanese  models or members who have participated in  fashion may also attempt to have a musical or acting career. Debuting egg magazine model and well known model from popteen magazine, known by her stage name as Milky Bunny,  model  also had a music career, using her given name Rina as her stage name. Debuting as a model for ranzuki, MensEGG and egg magazine and most known for her career in popteen magazine as a  model,  has also had a career in the J-pop industry as an idol under the stage name 'Pikarin Shiina'. She is under the management of music coorporation, AVEX Inc. Egg models  and  formed as a J-pop duo. Both  and  have not only tried to achieve a musical career for themselves; they created in 2010 the idol group that consist of only  with the objective to achieve the same amount of popularity as AKB48. At the time of auditioning there were at least four thousand applicants for this group. This was then narrowed to 24 members and then doubled, creating a group of 48 members. Including the creators who participated in the endeavour, there were fifty members. The idol group is called GAL's ( GAL's). They have two songs in their discography with Aina Tanaka and Yuma Takahashi. In 2011 they also collaborated with girl group GAL DOLL to continue to achieve their endeavor of having an idol group with only  members to have the same amount of fame as AKB48. A television program produced by egg magazine called GAL-TEN, which consisted of only models from that magazine, had their own J-pop single titled -GAL or (-GAL) in English. Project. Being the most  member, most fans have gravitated towards her in the group. To this day, most enthusiasts of this style gravitate towards her, as she still wears the  style. The group  have only one hit song, 'Boom Boom Meccha Maccho', which was released on 20 June 2007. It was the first J-pop group to be created from reader models from egg magazine. The J-pop group deeps, debuted in 1997 and lasted until 2007. Their debut single is 'Love is real'. Lil'B is a Japanese musical duo which consists of singer  and female rapper . They have created at least nine songs in four years; from 2008 until 2011. They should not be confused with the rapper Lil B despise the group and the rapper having the same stage name. He has been featured in the past with two different Japanese artist with fame, even for  enthusiasts, being  and Japanese R&B singer  . With Dear he had a notable  model perform in his music video, . This was not the last time that WISE worked with Kana Nishino since in 2013, together they would create a song called: . Another  duo are Sakurako and Kaede from Sweet Licious. Katy magazine  model  made a music debut in 2011 with her song mirror.

They produced a eurobeat song that was made for parapara. It is on the album  or read as Meloraba  with an album that multiple  such as famous   and a  fashion brand known as 'Rady' had produced their own music on said album. They were the previous owners of the ganguro café, black diamond and have created music in the past. They also have tried to reform their  as an idol group again when the new generation of black diamond began. This endeavour, Black Diamond -from 2000- has created music as well, but they later disbanded.

In 2011 the Japanese musician    ; performed an album with a eurobeat DJ, DJ . ̄They worked together on the album   , this album's singles would also be remixed into eurobeat tracks as well. When this album had been made, two of their songs from said album had gotten produced into a music videos; these were also performed with  models. The song    is still available to see on YouTube. In 2020  model Yuki Kimura had a collaboration with DJ Hello Kitty for a seven-hour livestream.

Most of the aforementioned  are or have been musicians; some are still artists with a cult following, while others are remembered by the  community because of their music. But most of those mentioned no longer participate as musicians. They have either stopped creating music or have never finished an album since their debut, but still are, have or had a  aesthetic and influence on the  media during their musical careers. Some have had no success outside the subculture during their careers, especially those debuting as a musical act but having a small fan base or being only known within the  subculture. Therefore, most of these artists have only single song in their discography.

 have recently been resurfacing within the music industry and in multiple music genres in Japan since 2019, most notably within the rap genre.

In 2019 Japanese rap group 'Zoomgals' debuted their career into the Japanese music industry; their group consist of six members with some already having notoriety within the Japanese music industry. Their name is based on the video conferencing program Zoom; as their first music video debuted their group with the use of the program. The group consists of rappers Haruko Tajima, Akko Gorilla, ASOBOiSM, Valknee, Marukido and Namichie. As stated, some of these members within the group have already been already present within the music industry such as Haruko Tajima and Akko Gorilla already being present since 2017. Rapper Valknee has also debuted her own career apart from being in the rap group 'Zoomgals'. 2019 was the year were J-pop and R&B singer, Thelma Aoyama released her song ～We are the world～ or ～We are the world～. They have also collaborated with singers and rapper Doja Cat and SZA by covering their song Kiss Me More.

Some artists have also created popular songs about  subculture, such as MANON's "GALCHAN MODE". The Japanese music company AVEX Inc. has pushed towards a new artist within the  style, being  or pronounced Kalen Anzai. She debuted with her song . She was later first recognized by the  style from her song 'GAL-TRAP'. She is currently producing music.

Western music has also seen and has given use to  within their music videos. Such as British indie pop band Kero Kero Bonito's lead singer Sarah Bonito being featured in Filipino artist Zeon Gomez or known from his stage name Ulzzang pistol or U-pistol. With their 2014 collaboration song titled 'Kawaii Pink 2'. Within that music video one can see multiple magazine flip throughs of multiple popteen magazines.

 Anime and manga Gals! was a manga that had much influence on  fashion, it is a manga that centers completely on the  subculture. Though it is said that a reboot of the series may be impossible. Other mangas having ties to  subculture are for example: Gal Japon, a slice of life manga surrounding the  subculture published in 2010. The 2018 manga called My Roomie Is a Dino and has received an anime adaptation in 2020. This manga centers on  fashion and subculture it started publishing in 2017. Debuting in 2017 and is still being published today, the series Yancha Gal no Anjou-san. Debuting manga from 2019, Hokkaido Gals Are Super Adorable! and is still being published as of 2021. In January 2018, the manga My Dress-Up Darling had received publishing and is presently still an on-going series; this manga received an anime adaptation, which aired from January 2022. Citrus, a yuri manga and anime, has a  protagonist who is befriended by a character who describes themselves as a " in disguise".

For example, Peach Girl, a manga that started publication in 1997. In 2005  or in English Galism: Love Supreme Sisters manga was released. A shōjo, romance, high school and comedy manga. In 2009, the manga KECHONPA was published, instead of being a shōjo manga, it had a drama driven plot. In 2014, the manga and anime series Please Tell Me! Galko-chan is published. It mostly discusses topics ranging from gender differences, sexual behavior or body complexes and differences in both the female and male bodies.

A stop motion anime series named Milpom was created to promote the  lifestyle, especially in its television pilot. Notably, the mall of Shibuya 109 is shown as the first shot as the scene in the pilot and is present during its entirety. But it eventually drifted towards other Japanese fashion subcultures instead of only centering on the  subculture. It was released in 2015 and lasted until 2017, due to lack of interest and bad reviews from both Japanese and foreign viewers. The voice actresses of this series consist of magazine models, especially within its series such as Anna Yano who appeared in mer and KERA magazines and Saki Shibata from the magazine mer as well. But the most notable and  voice actresses for this anime are the popteen models Hikari Shiina and Ai Matsumoto, they are also the very first characters to appear since the pilot and remain until the last airing of Milpom. Hikari Shiina voice-acting  Milpom and Ai Matsumoto voicing the secondary lead, Pon-pon; after the pilot her name had been changed to Silky.

These mangas are Gal Gohan which was published in 2016, the 2017 series My First Girlfriend Is a Gal, Don't Toy with Me, Miss Nagatoro and  Cleaning published in 2018. But due to the nature of its manga, the romance subplot having an age gap between characters, the actual plot going to unconsenting actions towards the  character or simply the participants of this fashion regarding these as not being the proper representation of what they want or want to be seen as  representation. Most of these  readers resent these manga series or their depiction of its fashion subculture.

Other manga that have ties to the  subculture but do not have it as their main plot point include the manga Komi Can't Communicate which debuted in 2015. Its ties to the  subculture is the side-character Rumiko Manbagi. In 2021, the manga Bleach had a one-shot where they introduced a character named YuYu Yayahara, a lieutenant under Lisa of 8th division.

Non  orientated series have also seen the appearances of  characters. A non- anime, being the well known series Pokémon has also had a  representation; first in the original anime within the first season on episode 15 called Battle aboard the St. Anne or in Japanese ; by the team rocket members, Jessie and James. But the Pokémon series already had a  representation; rather a  representation by the actual Pokémon, Jynx. The only issue is that this is still in debate within fans and Pokémon company themselves since the appearance of this Pokémon in 1996 for Pokémon Red and Blue on the Game Boy and the series since. Another serie can be exemplified by the comedy anime Mr. Osomatsu, which has a  character called Jyushiko Matsuno. She is the female counterpart to one of the sextuplets. Another being the series Skull-face Bookseller Honda-san which has also had appearances of characters who are of  influence; being two  and one  that are customers. The first  being a customer that is also a Fujoshi looking for books of her liking; she appeared in the second chapter of the manga, named: 'Yaoi girls from overseas'. She also appears in the first episode of the anime; the other two characters appearing  within later episode of the series as clients as well. Another non  orientated series is the shōnen series Sgt. Keroro with the character Angol Mois. The anime series Great Teacher Onizuka has a group of  students.

When episode 6 of the mini anime series of the smartphone rhythm game Hatsune Miku: Colorful Stage! named  or Leo/need Style first premiered on YouTube in 2022, it was accused by American or Western viewers of "doing/promoting  blackface" and "cultural appropriation" due to a scene inspired by  fashion substyle of  perceived as being blackface. The next day, the episode was withdrawn indefinitely and a public apology in both English and Japanese was uploaded on the official Twitter account. The removal of the episode is controversial and many fans of the game and show, either Japanese and American, were disappointed with the company's decision, with some blaming SEGA for its "bending the knee" and "listening to outraged Twitter users who insist that everyone should respect foreign cultures while applying and imposing their own Western prejudices, views, puritanism and imperialism against foreign media and subcultures". The episode was reuploaded to YouTube on March 15, 2022, with some modifications.

 Movies 

In 2009, Japanese model Rina Sakurai from the magazine  had a role starring in her own film and debuting as the protagonist of the movie 'GIRL'S LIFE', the protagonist in the movie Haruka Ichinose is also a  just as Rina Sakurai. In Japan, this movie was well received in terms of cinema viewing and box-office revenue. But the foreign  community, on social network services and in their written reviews, they indicate a dislike of this movie. It stems from focus on personal growth and its divergence from what  enthusiasts expected to see from this film.

The Japanese movie Sunny: a movie that came out in 2018, has the plot of a group of Japanese female high school students who are now adults reminiscing about their youth in the 1990s and during their time being . The thing about this Japanese centric movie is that it never happened or started in Japan; well the origin of this movie. Sunny from 2011 is a movie that has beats in term of the plot line instead taking place in South Korea during the 1980s. While having heavier implications such as the Gwangju Uprising and the democratization of South Korea as a country. As for the Japanese 2018 recirculation it is entirely about the whole 1990s ,  conflicts and just Japanese high schooler dilemmas.

 Products and commercial media 

 Food and daily items 
Among the many magazine ads were the advertisements for popteen magazine which had a partnership with the Japanese food company Ezaki Glico with their snack Pocky. These advertisements were called 'Deco-Pocky' which were sponsored by the magazine themselves to promote Pocky but by either creating new desserts or decorating the Pockys themselves into gaudy snacks. Pocky has also made Japanese television commercials with Tsubasa Masuwaka. Another Japanese brand that collaborated with Tsubasa Masuwaka but this time a Japanese candy brand for a commercial for chewing-gum. The Japanese chewing-gum brand ,  from the company Kraft Heinz; made a commercial debuting their new flavor at the time. Other noteworthy commercial collaboration would be for the Japanese tea and coffee brand UCC Ueshima Coffee Co. for the commercial of their product of 'Paradise Tropical Tea'. The Japanese McDonald's company has created an advertisement with Tsubasa Masuwaka for a marketing tie-in with Sanrio characters, being the Sugarbunnies. These were for a line of Happy Meal toys, that are hair accessories such as scunchies and plastic rings with their likeness. In 2019, a Japanese restaurant and café made use of the  subculture to promote its location with the use of desserts that are catered to the Heisei era demographic by having a parfait titled .

Japanese fashion brands have also had a way to create commercials to promote their own brand. For example, the  brand 'Rady' created their own J-pop and eurobeat-esque song to promote their brand.

Other commercials where Tsubasa Masuwaka participated in were for example, a Valentine's Day-related commercial for Universal Music Japan, a commercial that is for at the time a streaming service or digital music distributing platform to purchase particular songs curated for Valentine's Day from Universal Music Japan. Japanese general merchandise and department store Ito-Yokado made an umbrella commercial with Tsubasa Masuwaka for their subsidiary company Seven & I Holdings. The Japanese fast fashion brand Uniqlo made a brand deal with many famous Japanese entertainers or either people to act positively about their new puffer-jacket; it is to note that Tsubasa Masuwaka herself makes an appearance for her endorsement of the clothing product.

 Make-up and beauty accessories 

Various endorsement of cosmetic products, ranging from different makeup products to false eyelashes from non  owned cosmetic companies to  created and owned cosmetic companies were immense during the Hesei era.

A  owned cosmetic company would be Tsubasa Masuwaka's cosmetic line of  '' and false eyelash brand  ''. Both of these cosmetic brands are manufactured and sold by the Japanese company . Both of these brands still exist but with a different packaging and for a different clientele. The cosmetic company  also known by its license name ; best known for their false eyelash brand   released many commercials during the 2010s with many  models from that time period.

Japanese fashion brands have also had a way to create commercials to promote their own brand. For example, the  brand 'Rady' created their own J-pop and eurobeat-esque song to promote their brand. Their song is featured on an album featuring various  artists. and the brand LADYMADE often used  models in their music videos at the time, such as  model Yuka Obara. Another  brand COCO*LULU also creating a J-Pop girl group called COCO-GIRL, to promote their very own brand as well. They do not participate in the same magazine, Anri Nakajima and Nicole Fujita are from popteen, Shiho Īda is from egg and Ikumi Ōta is from ranzuki magazine.

There are many advertisements for wigs from varying Japanese companies with promotional endormsent from various  models.

Aquadoll made a commercial with the use of many  models to even actresses participating within its commercial to promote their various wigs. LOVES WIG made multiple commercials for wigs created with popteen model Kumiko Funayama's endorsement. While Prisila made a commercial with the endorsement of popteen model Nana Suzuki for a smaller array of wigs such as clip-on bangs and clip-on extensions. Prisila is also known for its tagline that has not only been present in commercials on Japanese television but in various  magazines as well, such as 'No wig, no life!'.

Japanese hair dye products have also had a variety of advertisements based on the  subculture that were also present during that time and can still be seen through YouTube. These two brands have been endorsed by two known  models, Tsubasa Masuwaka and Kumiko Funayama. They had been the endorsers for these brands but one being the promotional model for Palty while the other for Beauteen. Kumiko Funayama appearing in Beauteen commercials while Tsubasa Masuwaka having appeared multiple times in these commercials, with some commercials having appearances of popteen model Yui Kanno for Palty. Tsubasa Masuwaka has even appeared in the advertisements for its male hair dye variant of Palty. Even South Korean Pop group KARA have participated in 2011 for a commercial for the Palty brand with Tsubasa Masuwaka as the one placing the hair dye on her hair while KARA singing since the begin of the advertisement by promoting their new J-Pop at the time song,  .

Among the amount of wig products and hair dye-based advertisements produced for  there have also been electronic hair tools or accessories created during the popularity of the  subculture for  enthusiasts. Tsubasa Masuwaka has participated as the endorser for a portable hair straightener collection called: TsuyaGla Perfect. They were produced by the brand  , it is a hair straightener including accessories such as plastic covers to create curls with them to almost the same effect as a hair curl with a hair curler. They were produced in candy pink, midnight navy and virgin white. CJ Prime shopping also made a professional version of the 'TsuyaGla Perfect' hair straightener with the endorsement of Jun Komori as  model. This version being simply called: TsuyaGla Pro. The very same Japanese company have also made a wave hair curling iron and regular curling iron with Kumiko Funayama as the model who endorses this product, this time the product is called TsuyaGla Wave and TsuyaGla Curl.

 Toys and mascot items 

They have been under scrutiny from the Japanese public for its poor appearance. But these origami have been made to have this appearance from the very beginning due to the artificial nails of the  who made them. To add to these gashapons variety and rarity of these gashapon is the fact that though the set is only five different colored variations, they are all even the duplicates entirely different from each-other due to the fact that they are made by hand and aren't factory made gashapon; each one also comes with a philosophical question or phrase when collecting one of these  hand-made origami cranes. The selection of these capsule toys range from six different magazine covers made into keychains, plastic pins with  slang and new models from the magazine in metal pin with the added bonus of all of these variants having an added magazine logo as a sticker. On September 14, 2022 Sanrio made a collection of 17 items based on  subculture. What is available are four mascots in keychains, accessory cases and hair clips. A collaboration commercial between Russia and Japan was made with a photoshoot with model Natsuko Matsumoto the Russian mascot Cheburaska. The reasoning between the photoshoot is unknown but there is at least evidence of it.

 Electronics 
Another Japanese electronic brand Fujitsu that made a collaboration with both  and three brands from the Shibuya department store 109; these being Cecil McBee, COCO*LULU and Pinky Girls. This collaboration was made through the use of their flip phones products from the line of NTT Docomo. The electronics company Panasonic produced in 2011 the Panasonic Lumix FX77, a camera praised for its use of face altering functions such as adding makeup onto a photographed bare face. This was commercialized with the use of at the time  model ; it was presented by the American news broadcasting television program CBS News on their YouTube channel. The Japanese company , written FuRyu that produces  machines has made a collaboration at the time popteen model  for their new machine in 2011. In 2011  made a commercial for an iOS 3 application called iinurepublic; an application to recreate your dog as an avatar and discuss with other dog owners. Another iOS 3 application from 2011 is no make-up application The  or The   . It is an application that does the inverse of most photography applications for selfies it removes make-up instead of adding it. There is also a  version as well.

Even SEGA have used  as participants to promote a product, a commercial for the 1999 video-game Seaman on the Dreamcast with  discussing the product. The only difference being that Nintendo used models established from popteen magazine or well-known  at the time, while SEGA opted for unknown  to actual citizens who participate in the  substyle who auditioned to act as these characters solely for this commercial or they could just be actresses. Which is a social networking and avatar virtual community application that is not only used by  but does have  influences within the game and commercial partnerships. The use of these would be through in-game gashapon machines through either in-game currency or by microtransactions where items of virtual furniture or clothes could be acquired by playing them.

 Manga 
Manga had also its fair share of commercials dedicated to the  subculture. A manga that had an ad on Japanese television during the Heisei era and during its publication would be Gals! with its commercial not only created to serve as a marketing strategy to bring new readers to the quarterly shoujo manga magazine Ribon, the publisher of Gals! at the time. It was not necessarily targeting the  demographic but due to its story, the origins of the manga itself and the merchandise available for purchase at the time. It is likely that past  have purchased this exclusive merchandise from Ribon or current  now seek these accessories for themselves out of nostalgia. This would not be the only commercial created for and featuring characters from Gals!, as Tomy made multiple commercials dedicated to electronic devices with the Gals! branding. Also  have also had a part in commercializing or making a wider audience interested in manga or anime; such an example can be found from  magazine  which had a partnership with the manga Attack on Titan.

 Other 
 models for the magazine Ranzuki have also held an event in the department store Shibuya 109. The models were Natsumi Saito, Arisa Kamada and Rena Igo. One such example of commercial marketing centering or entirely base on the premise of having s to promote a brand's product, would be for a tampon commercial that happened in Tokyo were a hundred s of either famous, who have notoriety in Japanese magazines or online through social networking services to simply  enthusiast. They participated to display their approval for a brand of tampons by walking through Tokyo with fans that would have the tampon's brand name on it. The Japanese car-licensing service  or  also made an advertisement with a  actress.

 Web 
On the Internet, there are many makeup tutorials and event videos of  meeting each other on YouTube. Many videos discuss this fashion subculture, such as article videos, history videos, makeovers and questionnaire videos. Also the only way to take a look into the Heisei era  period and how Shibuya's famous mall, Shibuya 109 looked like then from the inside and out. Is through the YouTube channel: TokyoFashionMoEStyle; a YouTube channel established in August 2012. From September to December 2012, it posted a series of videos examining Shibuya's  fashion style and publicising the stores that were then in Shibuya 109. It was presented by Japanese JELLY magazine model Mana Honda. Another YouTube channel dedicated to  culture, especially towards the  mama subculuture, would be the Japanese YouTube channel 'kaorimama1'. This channel was established in June 2010, and published videos from 2010 until 2012. It had many and a series of episodes dedicated to the  mama lifestyle called BeMamaTV. This series had a show that would be published online in three parts and it debuted in 2010 and lasted until 2012. It is unclear if this YouTube channel had any commercial ties with the  magazine I LOVE MAMA or if it was its own channel. The  duo  have a YouTube channel all about LED and sometimes ASMR about electric use. There is also a video that has been uploaded by the YouTube channel of the older women's magazine  as the Jinsin channel; that has the twins  and  giving a make-over to an elderly women to resemble them.

There are also many parody videos of this style and even Japanese television program fragments remain viewable on YouTube, making a farce of s and s. One of the most famous is the 2011 ,  created by the Japanese music group 'Policeman' ,, which achieved brief popularity outside of Japan as an Internet meme. A recent parody that can be also interpreted as an honoring of every notable  that has appeared in manga, anime and hentai is the YouTube video  Sushi. It is a reference to an actual sushi restaurant in Rio de Janeiro, Brazil.

 Video-games 

There are also many characters from various Japanese media who have a  connection. For example, in the Yakuza series, especially in its third iteration, Yakuza 3. It debuted a side-mission which would then be included with its gameplay and features in later sequels. Where in fictional Kabukichō or as the game refers to it as Kamurocho, the player would need to recruit women to join a hostess club. These women were actual  from the magazine Koakuma Ageha. These models are used as actual character models in the game; their whole appearance was replicated to the smallest detail to have them created and placed as 3D characters. These models from Koakuma Ageha are Sayaka Araki, Nemu, Rina Sakurai, Eri Momoka, Riho Nishiyama, Rina Aikawa and Shizuka Muto. They have even been compared to their replicated three-dimensional counterparts. These characters would become hostess of these fictional hostess clubs; if the player chooses to do this side-mission and complete it. But the hostess club section of the game first appeared in Yakuza 2; in the sense of visiting the clubs themselves and not in the similar way as in the third game where the player recruited actual members for the clubs. They even have their own magazine in the games called Kamutai Magazine which is also replica of the actual magazine Koakuma Ageha. This content however was cut in the Western releases of Yakuza 3.

In Danganronpa the character of Junko Enoshima is inspired by  subculture; she is called a super high school level . In Revelations: Persona, there is a  named Yuka Ayase. No More Heroes 2: Desperate Struggle has a  enemy as a character. The player must defeat her to proceed in-game; she is known as Shinobu Jacobs who is encountered later in the game.

The Wagamama Fashion: Girls Mode series, known as Style Savvy and Style Boutique in North America and the PAL region respectively; is based on multiple Japanese street fashion subcultures and has a main focus on brands and selling apparel. The video-game has a variety of different brands and styles but also some of these that can be interpreted as mimicking or representing some  fashion brands. For example, the in-game apparel brand AZ*USA (AZ-USA in the West) has a striking resemblance to the  brand D.I.A.; another one would be the brand CherryBerry (April bonbon in the West) also having its own representation of the  style. Most probable inspiration would be the  brand COCO*LULU. The Nintendo DS was the first to introduce this series by the developers syn Sophia and then later got three sequels on the console's successor the Nintendo 3DS. In the West the word new would be added to the  pre-existing title of Style Savvy and Style Boutique. In total this franchise would make at least three games on the Nintendo 3DS for this series but with the addition of the Nintendo DS in total the series would be at least a quadruple series.

Specifically the Animal Crossing: Happy Home Designer on the Nintendo 3DS, the character named Lottie appears in that video-game for the first time, she is a character represented as an otter. After multiple encounters with her; there will be an in-game event on the third day of gameplay, where her uncle Lyle will state himself that she wears too much makeup in a game dialogue and in a later in-game event she can even be found without her makeup. She will state to the player character, that it was due to the fact she woke up too late for work but would often wear her makeup to impress a male colleague by wearing makeup; the colleague's name in game is Digby. She also appears in Animal Crossing: amiibo festival on the Wii U. Here are her looks on in-game. This character has recently been added to the Nintendo Switch version of Animal Crossing; Animal Crossing: New Horizons through the paid downloadable content of Animal Crossing: Happy Home Paradise. Another video-game franchise with a  character is in the Dragon Quest series. On the Nintendo DS game Dragon Quest IX has a  being the fairy character, Sandy. They have a series of applications that can be used for both the Nintendo DSi and Nintendo 3DS, they can be found on the Nintendo DSiWare and on the Nintendo eShop. It is a  applications for both video-game consoles developed by the company Atlus. Nintendo has also made with the use of amiibo a costume for the Wii U game Splatoon a  outfit for female inkling characters.

The Super Gals! anime series had its own video-game, it is a series of threequels published in 2001 and 2002; produced by Konami for the Game Boy color and the PlayStation. The anime series Hime Gal Paradise also had its own video-game on the Nintendo 3DS published by Nippon Columbia-games.

Another video-game that had popularity amongst , is the as avatar fashion web browser game and virtual community which later became a series on the Nintendo DS as a sequel series is Poupéegirl.

 Television 

 Japanese television 

Japanese television have a had an enormous amount of  based television broadcasting during the Heisei era. But also to either market, popularize the magazines or the stores in Shibuya 109 that were shown in these programs since they were either producing or had a contract with a television program or station for these shows to be made. Most of the models did not have a problem with these shows either since they were probably contracted by their magazines to participate in them. By using these models; the magazines would also to get more notoriety and marketability by doing these shows and so would these models.

For example, some television programs would make a single segment about current trends that were happening at the time. Such as in the Kantō region, that being of Tokyo; there were many small segments of programming sometimes dedicated to the  subculture. Another is during the 2010; looking for the latest trends then that were happening with the  subculture. Other television segments used  or  models to promote the show and the models themselves; such as this segment promoting  model Rina Sakurai. Another example of television segments about  could be about make-up application. Such as the big eye trend of the early 2010s called  ; These make-up techniques are said to make one's eyes resemble one of a child.

For example, the  Angeleek had its very own episode on Japanese television, fully dedicated to their events, general outings with each-other and how they made a younger generation than them participate or join their group to continue its legacy. Western  have been also featured on Japanese television, the Spanish  Hysterical have appeared twice. They have appeared in Spain and while visiting Japan. Other  that have also been featured were the American  Diamond Gal for a segment on a Nippon TV program. This segment had been created with over exaggerated situation, acted or staged moments to provide the show with a sort of drama. Western  have already had an appearance on Japanese television as early as 2013, with footage of a Japanese variety broadcast having a whole segment dedicated to various western  that were either in Japan at the time or from around the world. The first episode of this series would be of following a day in a shop-staff one spo daily custom. The only proof of this episode existing since FashionTV deletion of these episodes is a tumblr with gifs of this episode. There is also on that very same tumblr the proof in gif; of the episode of the shop staff Miauler Mew being followed for that episode.

But there were also shows that would have nothing to do with the  subculture but would have s or s for one episode or a segment in an episode and they would use these s as either a popularity stunt for the program or to be participants to become a farce of that episode in a show. But due to the loyalty and great sense of smell of her dog, it is already able to recognize that it is her. Even if some were there to educate the Japanese masses on the  fashion subculture, the harsh comedy applied to the style or participants by the hosts of these shows is apparent. It is uncertain if this was the name of the actual show or that it is entirely different.

 International television 
South Korea has also had influences from the  subculture but it was not used in a way that both Japanese or  participants would not have thought. This was made for a KBS Entertainment Awards which was shown on KBS2; a sketch-comedy show called Gag Concert. By him using the character , he depicted a character that is so self absorbed that she barely takes notice of those that are speaking directly to her and is portraited as an idiot. This depiction was created with barely any knowledge of the actual  culture or how most participants thought it should be represented. Park Seong-ho, stating himself in an interview that: 'He did not know the  style, in any sense. He did not even know what it exactly meant from the start. He just created the character from what little knowledge he had, such as the heavy makeup and their way of speaking Japanese'. The famous  to  Kanae Watanabe has had an episode on her life on the Polish broadcasting channel TVN.

Other appearances have also been on Televisión Pública of the  Sugar Queen for a broadcasting of a Matsuri in a park in Argentina.

See also

 AV idol
 Bullying
 Burusera Cosplay restaurant
 Ecchi Enjo kōsai Gravure Idols
 Kogal gyaru-moji, a type of lettering used in Japanese mobile phone texting to secretly send messages
 Gyaruo, a term referring to the male subculture
 Host and hostess clubs
 JK business
 Materialism
 PanchiraPimping
 Sun tanning
 Uniform fetishism
 Zettai ryōiki''

References

External links

 Gyaru – Subcultures and Sociology
 » The History of the Gyaru – Part One:: Néojaponisme » Blog Archive
 » The History of the Gyaru – Part Two:: Néojaponisme » Blog Archive
 » The History of the Gyaru – Part Three:: Néojaponisme » Blog Archive
 Defining The Gyaru Girl: A Look Into Japan's Gyaru Culture | YABAI - The Modern, Vibrant Face of Japan
 Cultural Anthropology of Gyarus and Gyaru-os (Yusuke Arai) | bookmeter (in Japanese)
 The Japanese Gyaru: Popular Culture, Globalization and the Reflection of a Trend | academia
 Fashioning Japanese Subcultures
 Think Global, Fear Local: Sex, Violence, and Anxiety in Contemporary Japan
 Tokyo Fashion City: A Detailed Guide to Tokyo's Trendiest Fashion Districts
 What are gyaru? (About the Slang, Fashion and History of Japan's Gyaru/Gal) | Japankyo
 Global Asian American Popular Cultures
 Fashion Theory, Volume 1 Berg Pub., 1997
 A look through the era of gyaru style for women | jprime (in Japanese)

Gyaru
Japanese fashion
Japanese subcultures
Japanese words and phrases
Japanese youth culture
Slang terms for women